Tiyapo Maso (born 30 December 1972) is a Botswana long-distance runner. He competed in the men's marathon at the 2000 Summer Olympics.

References

External links
 

1972 births
Living people
Athletes (track and field) at the 2000 Summer Olympics
Botswana male long-distance runners
Botswana male marathon runners
Olympic athletes of Botswana
Place of birth missing (living people)